Sonaraithari is a village in Sonaraithari CD block in the Deoghar subdivision of the Deoghar district in the Indian state of Jharkhand.

Geography

Location

Overview
The map shows a large area, which is a plateau with low hills, except in the eastern portion where the Rajmahal hills intrude into this area and the Ramgarh hills are there.  The south-western portion is just a rolling upland. The entire area is overwhelmingly rural with only small pockets of urbanisation.

Note: The full screen map is interesting. All places marked on the map are linked in the full screen map and one can easily move on to another page of his/her choice. Enlarge the full screen map to see what else is there – one gets railway connections, many more road connections and so on.

Area

Demographics
According to the 2011 Census of India, Sonaraithari had a total population of 3,538, of which 1,847 (52%) were males and 1,691 (48%) were females. Population in the age range 0–6 years was 639. The total number of literate persons in Sonaraithari was 2,899 (64.19% of the population over 6 years).

Civic administration

Police station
There is a police station at Sonaraithari village.

CD block HQ
Headquarters of Sonaraithari CD block is at Sonaraithari village.

Education
Government High School Sonaraithari is a Hindi-medium coeducational institution established in 1966. It has facilities for teaching in class IX and X.

References

Villages in Deoghar district